Yves Joly (October 11, 1908 – May 24, 2013) was a French puppeteer. Joly is recognized as an innovator in puppeteering, pioneering shows that used minimal paper marionettes, or hands alone. Joly received the Erasmus Prize in 1978 (along with Margareta Niculescu and Peter Schumann) for "reducing the puppet theatre to its simplest form".

References

External links 
 Recording of Joly's "Tragedy in Paper"
 German newsreel showing paper and hand puppetry (starts at 5:23)

People from Calvados (department)
1908 births
2013 deaths
French centenarians
French puppeteers
Men centenarians